David Parker may refer to:

 David C. Parker, theology professor and textual critic
 David C. W. Parker (born 1973) author and professor of political science at Montana State University
 David Parker (attorney) (born 1954), North Carolina politician and attorney
 David Parker (Australian politician) (born 1953), Australian politician from Western Australia
 David Parker (New Zealand politician) (born 1960), New Zealand politician
 David Parker (director) (born 1947), Australian cinematographer
 David Parker (climatologist), head of climate monitoring at the Hadley Centre
 David Parker (sound engineer) (born 1951), American sound engineer
 David Parker (swimmer) (1959–2010), British Olympic swimmer
 David Parker (football manager) (born 1984), English football manager
 David Stuart Parker (1919–1990), Governor of the Panama Canal Zone
 David J. Parker, former leader of the Alberta Green Party
 David Parker (Pennsylvania politician), American politician
 David Parker (Mississippi politician) (born 1969), American optometrist and politician
 David Parker (chemist) (born 1956), English chemical scientist and academic
 David Parker, convicted murderer of Arthur Warren
 David Parker, malodorant researcher and credited inventor of Israeli riot-control weapon Skunk (weapon) 
 David Parker, American musician known as Busy Bee Starski
 David H. Parker, memorialized at Camp Grohn for heroism

Dave Parker may refer to:
 Dave Parker (born 1951), American baseball player
 Dave Parker (rock musician) (born 1978), record producer, keyboard and guitar player used to play with Coheed and Cambria in their live shows
 Dave Parker (rugby), rugby league footballer of the 1960s for Great Britain, and Oldham
 Dave Parker (politician) (born 1940), Canadian politician
 Dave Parker (pornographic actor), actor in gay pornography

See also 
 Dai Parker (1904–1965), Welsh international rugby union player
 David Parker Ray (1939–2002), American serial killer
 David Parker Gibbs (1911–1987), United States Army General